Bossofala is a rural commune in the Cercle of Kati in the Koulikoro Region of south-western Mali. The commune contains the main town, Neguela, and 16 villages. At the time of the 2009 census the commune had a population of 17,455. The commune lies to the northwest of Bamako, the Malian capital, and is bounded to the west by the River Baoulé, a tributary of Bakoy.

References

External links
.

Communes of Koulikoro Region